Tongdak ("whole chicken") is a variety of chicken, prepared by deep-frying a whole chicken. It was a popular food in 1970s, being the only kind of fried chicken sold in Korea at that time. It is considered as the proto-Korean fried chicken.

As more varieties of "whole chicken" dishes are also enjoyed in Korea nowadays and the generic term tongdak can refer to any "whole chicken" (e.g. rotisserie chicken is called jeongi-gui-tongdak ("electric-grilled whole chicken") in Korea), the 70s-style whole chicken is now called yennal-tongdak ("old-time whole chicken"). It is now sold as retro food in many traditional markets as well as streets in provincial cities. Suwon in Gyeonggi Province is famous for its tongdak golmok ("tongdak alley") with dozens of tongdak restaurants that are over 40 years old.

Preparation 
Whole chicken seasoned with salt and black pepper is coated with a thin layer of weak flour (wheat flour with a low W), and deep-fried on low heat for a long time. Before frying, cuts are made to the thicker parts such as the breast and thighs to cook the chicken evenly.

See also 
 Korean cuisine
 Fried chicken
 Rotisserie chicken

References 

Deep fried foods
Fried chicken
South Korean chicken dishes
Street food in South Korea